Las Abiertas is one of the districts of the municipality of Arcos de la Frontera (Cádiz, Spain). The hamlet is located 12 km from Arcos de la Frontera and has a population of 208.

Services 
The hamlet has a social venue where cultural activities take place and a public school kindergarten (Julio Mariscal Poet).

Municipalities of the Province of Cádiz